Jafarabad (also Romanized as Ja‘farābād and Ja’farrābād) is a village in Salehan Rural District, in the Central District of Khomeyn County, Markazi Province, Iran. At the 2006 census, its population was 199, in 61 families.

References 

Populated places in Khomeyn County